Schöppenstedt is a former Samtgemeinde ("collective municipality") in the district of Wolfenbüttel, in Lower Saxony, Germany. Its seat was in the town Schöppenstedt. On 1 January 2015 it merged with the Samtgemeinde Asse to form the new Samtgemeinde Elm-Asse.

The Samtgemeinde Schöppenstedt consisted of the following municipalities:
 Dahlum 
 Kneitlingen
 Schöppenstedt
 Uehrde 
 Vahlberg
 Winnigstedt

Former Samtgemeinden in Lower Saxony